Ngọc Khánh is a ward of Ba Đình District in Hanoi, Vietnam.

References

Communes of Hanoi
Populated places in Hanoi